Paul McKenzie (born 4 October 1969) is a Scottish retired professional footballer who played as a midfielder. He played four matches in the English Football League with Burnley, and had spells in the Highland Football League with Peterhead and the Scottish Football League with Inverness Caledonian Thistle. His Burnley debut came on 7 April 1992, when he replaced Ian Bray in the 0–1 defeat to Stockport County in the first leg of the Associate Members' Cup semi-final.

References

External links

Paul McKenzie profile at claretsmad.co.uk

1969 births
Living people
Footballers from Aberdeen
Scottish footballers
Association football midfielders
Sunderland A.F.C. players
Peterhead F.C. players
Burnley F.C. players
Inverness Caledonian Thistle F.C. players
English Football League players
Scottish Football League players